Scum's Wish (Japanese: クズの本懐 Kuzu no Honkai) is a Japanese television drama series based on the manga series of the same name by Mengo Yokoyari. The drama premiered on Fuji TV on January 18, 2017.

Plot
Hanabi Yasuraoka (Miyu Yoshimoto) and Mugi Awaya (Dori Sakurada) look an ideal high school couple, but, they both like someone else. Hanabi Yasuraoka has liked Narumi Kanai (Kouki Mizuta) since she was a kid and Mugi Awaya likes his private tutor Akane Minagawa (Rina Aizawa).

As a couple, Hanabi Yasuraoka and Mugi Awayai have 3 conditions: they are not supposed to like each other, they will break up if either of them succeed in love with their secret crush and they will fulfill their physical desires.

Cast
 Miyu Yoshimoto as Hanabi Yasuraoka	
 Dori Sakurada as Mugi Awaya
 Sarii Ikegami as Sanae Ebato
 Kouki Mizuta as Narumi Kanai
 Rina Aizawa as Akane Minagawa	
 Hiroki Ino as Takuya
 Shiori Yoshida as Mei
 Shiho as Moka Kamomebata
 Misato Kawauchi as Misato
 Momo Ogata

Production

Development
A live-action TV series adaptation was announced in December 2016.

Writing
Ere Hagiwara and Motoko Takahashi were both hired to write the script

Casting
It was announced Miyu Yoshimoto was cast as Hanabi Yasuraoka and Dōri Sakurada has been cast as Mugi Awaya.

References

External links
 
 

Japanese television dramas based on manga